Bashkeer Alighmani literally means German Towel or more precisely German Hand Towel. It is usually a cotton cloth measuring about 30 cm by 90 cm with black background and very colorful flowery design. It is worn as a head cover for women of some towns in Hauran, specifically Ar Ramtha in North Jordan. 
It is thought to have been brought back from Germany in the 1970s when many Ramthan used to import used Mercedes-Benz cars from Germany.  

Jordanian culture